The Chindit Memorial is a war memorial in London, England, that commemorates the Chindit special forces, which served in Burma under Major General Orde Wingate in the Second World War. The memorial was erected in Victoria Embankment Gardens in 1990, near the Ministry of Defence headquarters, and also commemorates Wingate, who died on active service in Burma in 1944. It became a Grade II listed building in August 2020.

The Chindits – officially designated the 77th Indian Infantry Brigade in 1943, and the 3rd Indian Infantry Division in 1944 – were organised by Wingate to serve behind Japanese lines in the Burma Campaign, in 1943 and 1944. They are named after the mythical chinthe, a guardian of Burmese temples, which appears on the badge of the forces.

The memorial was designed by architect David Price. The front of the monument has an inscription to the memory of the Chindits, and also has a plaque depicting of the Chindit badge on a blue background and the Chindit motto, "The boldest measures are the safest". The inscription also lists the four men of the Chindits who were awarded the Victoria Cross: Major Frank Blaker, Captain Michael Allmand, Lieutenant George Albert Cairns and Rifleman Tulbahadur Pun. The units involved are listed on the sides of the monument, and the rear of the monument is dedicated to Wingate, with a blue plaque depicting a portrait of Wingate, a quotation from Winston Churchill: "A man of genius who might well have become a man of destiny", and a reference to Wingate's influence in the foundation of the state of Israel and the formation of the Israel Defence Forces, arising from his service in the British Mandate of Palestine in the 1930s.

The memorial was unveiled on 16 October 1990 by Prince Philip, Duke of Edinburgh. There is a separate further memorial to the Chindits in the National Memorial Arboretum, and a memorial at Hurlburt Field in Florida commemorates the cooperation between the Chindits and the US 1st Air Commando Group.

In August 2020, to commemorate the 75th anniversary of VJ Day and shortly before the 30th anniversary of its unveiling, the Chindit Memorial became a Grade II listed building.

References

External links
 Chindits Memorial, National Heritage List for England, Historic England 
 Second World War Memorial to Chindit Special Forces Listed at Grade II to Celebrate VJ Day, Historic England, 13 August 2020 
 Major General O C Wingate DSO And The Chindits, War Memorials Register, Imperial War Museums
 Chindit Memorial, London, chindits.info
 Chindits Memorial, ww1cemeteries.com
 Chindit Memorial, roll-of-honour.com
 Chindit Chasing, Operation Longcloth 1943, chinditslongcloth1943.com
 Chindit Memorial dedicated, National Memorial Arboretum, 15 August 2013 
 London: Chindit Memorial, Twentieth Century Society
 Bust: Wingate, londonremembers.com
 Monument: Chindits, londonremembers.com
 Chindit Memorial at Hurlburt Field, Florida

1990 establishments in England
1990 sculptures
British military memorials and cemeteries
Buildings and structures completed in 1990
Military memorials in London
Monuments and memorials in London
Outdoor sculptures in London
World War II memorials in England
Victoria Embankment
Grade II listed buildings in the City of Westminster